James, Jim, or Jimmy Edwards may refer to:

Politicians
 J. Fred Edwards (1902–1978, born James Frederick Edwards), Canadian politician
 James B. Edwards (1927–2014), American politician
 James Bevan Edwards (1835–1922), British politician and army general
 James Edwards (Los Angeles politician), member of the Los Angeles, California, Common Council
 James T. Edwards (1838–1914), American educator, Methodist minister, and politician
 Jim Edwards (Canadian politician) (born 1936), Canadian politician
 Jim Edwards (New Zealand politician) (1927–2010), New Zealand politician
 Jim Edwards (political activist) (1892–1952), New Zealand socialist, communist, political activist, and salesman
 Jim Edwards (Queensland politician) (1879–1952), member of the Queensland Legislative Assembly

Sportspeople
 James Edwards (basketball) (born 1955), former NBA basketball player
 Jim Joe Edwards (1894–1965), American baseball player
 Jim Edwards (footballer, born 1874) (1874–?), Welsh footballer
 Jimmy Edwards (gridiron football) (1952–2002), Canadian gridiron football player
 Jimmy Edwards (footballer, born 1905) (1905–1982), English footballer with West Bromwich Albion F.C.
 Jimmy Edwards (rugby league) (1926–2015), New Zealand rugby league international

Other
"Agent J" James Darrell Edwards III, a fictional character from Men in Black
 James Edwards (actor) (1918–1970), American film actor
 James Edwards (bookseller) (1757–1816), English bookseller and bibliographer
 James Francis Edwards (1921–2022), Canadian fighter pilot and ace during World War II
 James L. Edwards, president of Anderson University in Indiana
 James R. Edwards (born 1945), American New Testament scholar
 James F. Edwards (1910–1991), American businessman and philanthropist
 James Edwards (character), a fictional character on One Tree Hill
 Jimmy Edwards (1920–1988), English comedian
 Jimmy Edwards (musician) (1949–2015), British musician
 Jimmie M. Edwards, Missouri judge political appointee
 James Edwards, American political activist and host of The Political Cesspool radio program